Posterior fossa may refer to:

 Posterior cranial fossa, an area of the head
 PHACES Syndrome, a condition of the posterior cranial fossa
 Posterior intercondyloid fossa, an area of the tibia